Bóbrka may refer to the following places: 
Historical Polish name for Bibrka, Ukraine
Bóbrka, Lesko County in Subcarpathian Voivodeship (south-east Poland)
Bóbrka, Krosno County in Subcarpathian Voivodeship (south-east Poland)